The National Supercomputing Center for Energy and the Environment (NSCEE), is a supercomputing facility housed at UNLV in Las Vegas, Nevada.  It was established in 1989 by an act of Congress, PL-101.  The facility is used to address a wide variety of scientific studies and applications.

Supercomputers 
Silicon Graphics
Sun Microsystems

External links 
NSCEE
National Science Foundation

University of Nevada, Las Vegas
Supercomputer sites